Sir Eustace de Ribemont (died 19 September 1356) was a French nobleman, who was the French standard-bearer in 1346.

Biography
Eustace was lord of Ribemont in Tierasche, Picardy. He fought in the Hundred Year's War, where he fought during the battle of Calais in 1350. The French knight Geoffroi de Charny, bribed Amerigo de Pavia of the Calais garrison to open a gate for the French forces. Ribemont was engaged in combat by King Edward III of England, who fought incognito, whom Ribemont knocked down a couple of times during the fight and was later captured. He was later released without ransom for his bravery.

He was the French standard-bearer at the battle of Poitiers on 19 September 1356, where he was killed.

Citations

References

 

Year of birth unknown
1356 deaths
14th-century French people
French soldiers
People of the Hundred Years' War
Place of birth missing
Lords of France